Dagmar Belakowitsch-Jenewein (born 24 August 1968 in Vienna) is an Austrian politician for the Freedom Party of Austria (FPÖ), currently serving as a Member of the Parliament of Austria, the National Council. She chairs the Committee for Health Affairs and is deputy chair of the parliamentary group of her party.

She studied medicine at the University of Vienna and the University of Graz, graduating as Dr. med. univ. She became a board member of the local party in Vienna in 2006, and was elected to the National Council the same year. She succeeded Barbara Rosenkranz as chair of the Committee for Health Affairs in 2008.

She is married and has a son.

References

External links
Dagmar Belakowitsch-Jenewein
Österreichisches Parlament - Persönliche Porträts von MandatarInnen

21st-century Austrian women politicians
21st-century Austrian politicians
1968 births
Living people
Members of the National Council (Austria)
Freedom Party of Austria politicians
Politicians from Vienna